Office of the Attorney General (OAG) is a constitutional body of Nepal, The main function is to provide legal advice to the Government of Nepal and other officials designated by the Government of Nepal on constitutional and legal matters.

Attorney General 
According to Article 157(2) of the Constitution of Nepal, the Attorney General is appointed by the President on the recommendation of the  prime ministers. The current Attorney General, Dinmani Pokharel, was appointed on 29 December, 2022.

List of Attorney General 
1. Khamma Bahadur Khati (16 July, 2021 - 26 December, 2022) 

Hon. Attorney General Mr. Khamma Bahadur Khati is the incumbent and twenty-eighth Attorney General of Nepal. He has been practicing law as an Advocate from last 28 years. He had served as a Secretary General of the Nepal Bar Association. He also served in the various committees of Nepal Bar Association. Previously he served in the several positions of Kathmandu District Bar Association. He holds Master Degree in Humanities & Social Science, Bachelor in Laws (B.L.), and Bachelor in Humanities & Social Science from Tribhuvan University. He is notable figure in the field of Civil & Commercial Laws. He had also participated in several national and international programs in several areas of laws. 

2. Ramesh Badal (21 March, 2021 - 13 July, 2021)

Mr. Ramesh Badal was the twenty-seventh Attorney General of Nepal. He holds Master of Labour Laws and Labour Welfare Degree from Pune University, India and Diploma in International Labour Standard and ILO Declaration on Fundamental Principle of Right at Work from International Training Center of ILO, Italy.He has been practicing law as an Advocate from last 27 years. Previously, he served as the President and Secretary of the Appellate Court Bar Association, Patan (now the High Court Bar Association, Patan). He also served in the various committees of the Nepal Bar Association. He is notable figure in the field of Labour Laws. Previously, he served in several leadership positions of labour organizations, and had played pivotal role in the drafting of labour laws and standards. He is recognized for his contributions in the establishment of Social Security Fund and Social Security Schemes. He has also facilitated as an Expert in several international and national platforms. During his tenure, the Third Five-Year Strategic Plan of the Office of the Attorney General was introduced.

3. Agni Prasad Kharel 

Senior Advocate Mr. Agni Prasad Kharel was the 26th Attorney General of Nepal. Previously, he served as the Minister of Law, Justice and Parliamentary Affairs, Member of Constituent Assembly, and General Secretary of the Nepal Bar Association. Specifically, he had played an instrumental role in the constitution drafting process. He had been accredited for leading the prosecution system for the effective implementations of the newly enacted Criminal Codes. He led the office to implement the Second Strategic Plan. There had been rapid infrastructure development works (with the construction of more than three dozen Government Attorneys Offices), including the construction of the new building of the Office of the Attorney General, Nepal. During his tenure, the number of Government Attorneys and Staffs was increased, and the coordination with the Chief Attorney Offices was also enhanced. He played a pivotal role in enhancing the capacity of government attorneys. During his tenure Office became member of International Association of Prosecutors. 

4. Basanta Ram Bhandari (18 August, 2017 - 15 February, 2018) 

Senior Advocate Mr. Basanta Ram Bhandari served as the twenty-fifth Attorney General of Nepal. Previously, he served as an Executive Member of the Nepal Bar Association and president of Supreme court bar association. He has been practicing law more than four decades.

5. Raman Kumar Shrestha (8 August, 2016 - 13 August, 2017)

Senior Advocate Mr. Raman Kumar Shrestha served as the twenty-fourth Attorney General of Nepal. Previously, he served as the General Secretary of the Nepal Bar Association. He is recognized for his contributions in implementing the Strategic Plan of the Office. He played an important role in the institutional reforms of the office. He also introduced the National Conference of Government Attorneys, and the National Conference of Investigator and Prosecutor.

6. Hari Prasad Phuyal ( 18 April, 2016 - 4 August, 2016)

Mr. Hari Prasad Phuyal served as the twenty-third Attorney General of Nepal. He is recognized for his contributions in framing and implementing the Second Strategic Plan of the Office of the Attorney General, Nepal. He is currently serving as the Justice of the Supreme Court of Nepal.

7. Hari Krishna Karki ( 15 October, 2015 - 1 March, 2016)

Senior Advocate Mr. Hari Krishna Karki served as the twenty-second Attorney General of Nepal. Previously, he served as the President and general Secretary of the Nepal Bar Association. He is currently serving as the Justice of the Supreme Court of Nepal.

8. Baburam Kunwar ( 17 February, 2014 - 12 October, 2015)

Senior Advocate Mr. Baburam Kunwar served as the twenty-first Attorney General of Nepal. Later, he became the first Provincial Chief of Gandaki Province.

References 

1951 establishments in Nepal